The Tiefenstock (3,515 m) is a mountain of the Urner Alps, located on the border between the Swiss cantons of Valais and Uri. Its summit is the tripoint between the valleys of the Rhone Glacier (in Valais), the Damma Glacier and the Tiefen Glacier (both in Uri).

References

External links
 Tiefenstock on Hikr

Mountains of the Alps
Alpine three-thousanders
Mountains of Switzerland
Mountains of Valais
Mountains of the canton of Uri
Uri–Valais border